Splatterthrash is an album released in June 2006 by Ghoul. The album features many surf guitar riffs, as well as thrash metal riffs.

Story and Concept
The album's lyric sheet is presented in a comic book-like fashion, with talk boxes narrating the story. The album's concept begins with "Bury the Hatchet." This tells of a cult, which Ghoul defeats, attacking Ghoul in an effort to take the crystal skull in their possession. Later, the cult comes back with Killbot, defeats Ghoul, and takes over Creepsylvania. Creepsylvania becomes a fundamentalist Christian state while Ghoul waits to get revenge.

Track listing

Personnel
Ghoul
Digestor - vocals, guitars
Dissector - vocals, guitars
Cremator - vocals, bass
Fermentor - drums, vocals

Additional personnel
Baron Samedi - Didjeridoo
Mr. Fang - Theremin and Electric Organ
Dan Randall - Mastering
Jason Kocol - Engineering
Sal Raya - Engineering
Heather Necker - Photography

References

2006 albums
Concept albums
Ghoul (band) albums